Yuddho (or Juddho) is a 2005 Indian action thriller film written and directed by Rabi Kinagi and produced by Shree Venkatesh Films. The screenplay of the film was written by N.K. Salil. The story revolves around a police officer who is charged with false accusation of murdering his wife and imprisoned as he has been investigating a rape case that involves the younger brother of a powerful MLA. The officer then manages to evade the prison and have his revenge. It stars Mithun Chakraborty and Jeet for the first time together, along with Debashree Roy, Koel Mallick, Kaushik Banerjee, Bharat Kaul and Rajatava Dutta.

The film became the highest grossing Bengali film of the year earning more than  3 crore at the box office.

Plot
The story revolves around police officer Agnishwar Ray (Mithun Chakraborty), who keeps getting transferred due to his aggressive nature towards criminals. He ends up at Uttarpara police station where young boy Surja Sinha (Jeet) is the local strongman. Ranjit Saha (Bharat Kaul), the younger brother of the local MLA named Joy Chand Saha (Rajatava Dutta), abducts a girl when the girl was returning from a college function, and violently rapes her in his car, leaving her to die. Agnishwar arrests Ranjit. To take revenge, the MLA gets Agnishwar put in prison and his wife Sandhya (Debashree Roy) murdered. There starts Agnishwar's revenge where he slowly kills all the persons responsible for putting him behind bars and killing his wife, ending with the death of the MLA and himself at the hands of Surja, who has by now become a police officer.

Cast
 Mithun Chakraborty as DSP Agnishwar Roy
 Jeet as Surya Sinha, Sub-inspector
 Debashree Roy as Sandhya Roy
 Koel Mullick as Barsha Sinha
 Rajatava Dutta as Joy Chand Saha, MLA of Uttarpara
 Kaushik Banerjee as Ghoshal, Agnishwar Roy's junior in the department
 Bharat Kaul as Ranjit Saha, Joy Chanda Saha's younger brother
 Sumit Ganguly as Kaalu, Joy Chand Saha's henchman
 N.K. Salil as constable Haripada
 Ashok Mukherjee
 Sanjib Dasgupta as DSP Pradhan

Soundtrack

Production
 
Initially the role of Mrs. Sandhya Roy was offered to Rachna Banerjee and then to Rituparna Sengupta. After both of them refused to play the role, it was offered to Debashree Roy.

References

2005 films
Bengali-language Indian films
Films directed by Rabi Kinagi
Mithun's Dream Factory films
Films scored by Jeet Ganguly
Films shot in Ooty
Films about rape in India
Fictional portrayals of the West Bengal Police
Indian action drama films
2000s masala films
2000s Bengali-language films
2005 action drama films